Julio Jiménez is a Colombian writer of telenovelas for RTI Colombia.

His telenovelas
Julio Jiménez has written numerous telenovelas including:

Bella Calamidades (2009), Madre Luna (2007), La viuda de blanco (2006), El cuerpo del deseo (2005), "Pasión de gavilanes" (2003),(2022), "Amantes del desierto" (2001), "Luzbel esta de visita" (2001), "Rauzán" (2000), Yo amo a Paquita Gallego (1998), "La Casa del naranjo" (1998), "La Viuda de Blanco" (1996), "Las Aguas mansas" (1994), "En cuerpo ajeno" (1992), Profanación (1976), El ángel de piedra, El cazador nocturno, El gallo de oro, El hijo de Ruth, El hombre de negro, El Virrey Solís, Recordarás mi nombre, La abuela, La feria de las vanidades, La marquesa de Yolombó, La pezuña del diablo, Lola Calamidades, Los cuervos, Los premios, El segundo enemigo, Por qué mataron a Betty si era tan buena muchacha, Un largo camino, Pasión de gavilanes", gavilanes"(2010)

External links
Julio Jimenez in the 10 best writers
History of Television in Colombia
Colombian Television and imagination
El cuerpo del deseo: A New Incarnation for Telenovelas

Colombian male writers
Living people
Year of birth missing (living people)
Place of birth missing (living people)